Ionel Floroiu (born 14 November 1962) is a Romanian politician. He was elected to the Chamber of Deputies in December 2016 and again in December 2020.

References 

Living people
1962 births
Place of birth missing (living people)
20th-century Romanian politicians
21st-century Romanian politicians
Members of the Chamber of Deputies (Romania)